Blairgowrie High School is a high school in Blairgowrie, Scotland. Blairgowrie High School has 719 students (as of September census) from Blairgowrie and the surrounding area.

The current head teacher is Beverly Leslie.

History

The school was constructed between 1956 and 1958.

In 2005, the school was one of the first twenty eight schools in Scotland to be awarded Schools of Ambition status.

Notable former pupils

 Fred MacAulay - comedian
 Luke Sutherland - author
 Dougie MacLean - Folk singer and composer
 Bradley Neil - Professional Golfer 
 Jamie Robson - Footballer

See also
 Education in Scotland

References

External links
 

Secondary schools in Perth and Kinross
1958 establishments in Scotland
Educational institutions established in 1958
Blairgowrie and Rattray